Pygoctenucha azteca is a moth in the family Erebidae. It was described by William Schaus in 1892. It is found in Mexico.

References

Moths described in 1892
Phaegopterina